State Road 11, is an IB-class road in northern Serbia, connecting Hungary at Kelebija with Subotica. It is located in Vojvodina.

The existing route is an expressway. Although construction of the road, which encircles the city, has not yet started, a small temporary section is in operation. According to the Space Plan of Republic of Serbia, there are no plans to upgrade the road to a motorway, and it is expected to be maintained in its current state.

Sections

See also 
 Roads in Serbia

References

External links 
 Official website - Roads of Serbia (Putevi Srbije)
 Official website - Corridors of Serbia (Koridori Srbije) (Serbian)

State roads in Serbia